Mark Alan Helm was an attorney in the Elizabeth Smart kidnapping case, where he was a member of the team representing the alleged kidnapper, Brian David Mitchell.

Helm was born on May 31, 1970 in Salt Lake City, Utah. He graduated from Bates College in Lewiston, Maine in 1992 and Vanderbilt University Law School in 1997, after which he practiced criminal defense in New York City, and Salt Lake City.

In 2004, Helm represented Melissa Ann Rowland, aged 28, a woman in Salt Lake City, Utah, who was charged with murder after the death of one of her near term twins—the result, say prosecutors, of her refusal to have a medically advised caesarean section.

In 2005, in a case that made national headlines, Helm represented Brian David Mitchell who was charged with the Elizabeth Smart kidnapping and sexual assault.  Smart, who was 14 at the time, was kidnapped at knife point from her bedroom on June 5, 2002 and found alive nine months later on March 12, 2003 a few miles from her home in Sandy, Utah.

On December 17, 2008 Mark Helm was found dead in his home.

Sources
Helm in the Smart Case

Living people
1970 births
Lawyers from Salt Lake City
Bates College alumni
Vanderbilt University Law School alumni